Nothing to Lose is a 1997 American buddy action comedy film starring Tim Robbins and Martin Lawrence. The film was directed by Steve Oedekerk, who also wrote the film and made a cameo appearance as a lip-synching security guard in the film.

The film was released in July 1997 and went on to gross over US$40 million at the box office. The theme song was "If I Had No Loot" by Tony! Toni! Toné!, but it was a remixed version of the song "Not Tonight"—performed by Lil' Kim and featuring Da Brat, Left Eye, Angie Martinez, and Missy Elliott—that garnered the most attention from the soundtrack as it gained much airplay on television and radio and reached the top ten on the Billboard Hot 100 chart.

The film was shot at various locations in California and New Jersey. The main California locations were Los Angeles—including the U.S. Bank Tower for Nick's office—and Monrovia. The main location in New Jersey was Bloomfield.

Plot
Advertising executive Nick Beam thinks his life is going very well, until he returns home from work and finds his wife Ann apparently having an affair with another man. He deduces that the man is his boss, Philip Barrow, after finding a pair of Philip's cufflinks in the kitchen. On the edge of a nervous breakdown, Nick drives around the city until carjacker Terrence Paul "T-Paul" Davidson jumps into his car and attempts to rob him. Turning the tables on his mugger, Nick kidnaps T-Paul and later drives him to a diner in an Arizona desert. After T-Paul robs a gas station, Nick teams up with him and plans to rob Philip in revenge for the affair. Nick knows the combination to a safe in Philip's office containing a large amount of cash, as well as the best time to enter, and where not to venture in the building. T-Paul knows the weaknesses of the security system, how to avoid the cameras, and how to get through any electronic locks that they might encounter.

Another criminal duo, Davis "Rig" Lanlow and Charles "Charlie" Dunt, get blamed for the gas station robbery. When they find Nick and T-Paul, the duo ram Nick's truck off the road and hold the pair at gunpoint. After a brief confrontation, T-Paul manages to disarm them, but accidentally shoots Nick in the arm. They make their escape as Rig and Charlie follow them back to Los Angeles. Meanwhile, T-Paul takes Nick to his apartment so they can rest and his wife can bandage Nick's arm; while at the apartment, Nick sees T-Paul's electrical engineering certification and a stack of rejection letters from prospective employers. The next night, the pair execute their plan. During the robbery, Nick damages Philip's prize fertility statue and reveals himself to the security camera, taunting his boss about getting revenge. The pair then hide from a security guard, who lip-synches to music for over an hour. The guard soon leaves and they leave the office unseen and they settle at a hotel. It becomes bad when Rig and Charlie, who stole Nick's business card and followed them from the office to the hotel, show up at their room, take T-Paul hostage and steal the money. Meanwhile, Nick has gone to the bar to have a drink, where he meets Danielle, a flower shop woman he met earlier. When Danielle takes him up to her room to have sex with him, Nick is about to sleep with her until he refuses and leaves.

Nick calls Ann to confront her about the affair, but she explains that he was wrong. Nick actually caught Ann's sister and her fiancee in bed when they came into town earlier than expected; having never seen her sister before, Nick mistook her for Ann. He learns that Philip's cufflinks were left behind at a past Christmas party and Ann left them out for Nick to return them to Philip and Ann still loves him. Overcome with remorse, Nick remembers about T-Paul, returns to the room and saves T-Paul from a trap that Rig and Charlie placed him in. They catch up to Rig and Charlie and chase them into an alley. Nick shoots the gun out of Rig's hand and the pair get back the money as they leave Rig and Charlie tied up for the police to find them. As they are driving away, Nick insists on returning the money back to the office, but T-Paul, who had planned on using the money to move his family out of their troubled neighborhood, refuses to take it back and they get into a fight. After they stop fighting, Nick assures T-Paul that nobody will bother to look at the security tapes unless something is missing or damaged and that he can still make things right. T-Paul decides to give the money to Nick and ends their partnership. He walks back home to his family, while Nick drives back home and reunites with Ann.

Returning to his job, Nick is told that Philip is reviewing the security tapes to investigate a burglar who vandalized his statue. Nick races to his boss's office but is too late to stop them, only to discover that the tape was recorded over right before the "burglar" removed his mask, and that a man identifying himself as an electrician was allowed into the building earlier in the day. Knowing that T-Paul is the one who recorded over the tape, Nick goes to see T-Paul and thanks him for saving Nick from losing his job. In return, Nick offers T-Paul a job as an electrician and a security expert to work on a new security system for his company, which he happily accepts.

In the post-credit scene, a mailman shows up at the gas station in Arizona and returns the money that T-Paul stole.

Cast

Reception

Critical reception
Nothing to Lose was met with negative reviews from professional critics. Review aggregator Rotten Tomatoes reports that 31% of the critics has given the film a positive review based on 26 reviews (8 "Fresh", 18 "Rotten") with an average rating of 5.3/10. Phil Villarreal of the Arizona Daily Star gave the film a positive review and stated, "Tim Robbins' understated depression and Martin Lawrence's hyperactive ranting are the perfectly hilarious foil for one another."

Audiences polled by CinemaScore gave the film an average grade of "A−" on an A+ to F scale.

Box office
The film made its debut at #4 at the North American box office, and made $11,617,767 on its opening weekend in 1,862 theaters. Its widest release was 1,888 theaters. During its run, the film made a domestic total of $44,480,039. Its production budget was $25 million.

Awards and nominations
 Bogey Awards
 won in 1998

Soundtrack

A soundtrack containing hip hop and R&B music was released on July 1, 1997 by Tommy Boy Records. It peaked at #12 on the Billboard 200 and #5 on the Top R&B/Hip-Hop Albums and was certified gold on September 3, 1997.

References

External links

1997 films
American action comedy films
American crime comedy films
American buddy comedy films
Touchstone Pictures films
Films set in Arizona
Films shot in New Jersey
Films directed by Steve Oedekerk
Films produced by Martin Bregman
Films scored by Robert Folk
African-American comedy films
Films with screenplays by Steve Oedekerk
1990s buddy comedy films
1997 action comedy films
1997 comedy films
1990s English-language films
1990s American films